Justice Thurman may refer to:

Allen G. Thurman, associate justice of the Ohio Supreme Court
Samuel R. Thurman, associate justice of the Utah Supreme Court